The National Boatswain is the leading youth member of Sea Scouts program of the Boy Scouts of America. The National Boatswain is a member of the National Sea Scout Committee and the Boy Scouts of America Executive Board.

National Sea Scout Boatswain

References

Boy Scouts of America
National Sea Scout Boatswain of the Boy Scouts of America
Scouting-related lists
Sea Scouting